Lee Reynolds was a Broadway theatre and television producer.  She was Tony Award nominated for The Changing Room in 1973.

https://www.findagrave.com/memorial/191486701/lee-begelman

References

American theatre managers and producers
Living people
Year of birth missing (living people)